South Will Rise Again may refer to:

 "South Will Rise Again", an episode of the television series Preacher
 The South Will Rise Again, a book by J. T. Edson
 "The South Will Rise Again", a song by The Auteurs from the album How I Learned to Love the Bootboys

See also
Lost Cause of the Confederacy, an ideological movement in the United States